Kidnapped is an American crime drama television series created by Jason Smilovic, which aired on NBC from September 20, 2006, to August 11, 2007.

Overview
The series premise planned to feature a new kidnapping each season, with a core continuing cast who investigated the kidnappings, and additional cast members who changed each season, consisting of the kidnappers and the people affected. The show told the story from the discrete points of view of the victim, the parents, the investigators, and the kidnappers.

The core cast included ex-FBI operative Knapp (Jeremy Sisto) offering privately contracted services to retrieve kidnapping victims, his technologically adept coordinator and assistant Turner (Carmen Ejogo), and FBI Agent Latimer King (Delroy Lindo).

Timothy Hutton and Dana Delany co-starred as an affluent New York couple whose teenage son Leopold (Will Denton) is abducted. Other characters included Gutman (Mädchen Amick) and "The Accountant" (James Urbaniak), Leopold's bodyguard (and King's brother-in-law) Virgil Hayes (Mykelti Williamson), and FBI agents played by Linus Roache and Michael Mosley.

Ratings
Nielsen ratings for the premiere were 6.0, with total viewers of 7.5 million, and adults 2.8 in the 18-49 demographic. The second episode scored a 2.1 in the 18-49 demographic, with a total of 6.3 million viewers.

Scheduling
Kidnapped was originally scheduled to air on Tuesdays at 9:00 pm ET in the U.S., as announced in a presentation made by NBC in advance of the normal upfront presentations. This placed Kidnapped in a timeslot against the popular Fox TV series House. Because of this and similar problems with other shows, in an unusual move on May 25, 2006, NBC announced significant changes to its fall schedule, moving Kidnapped to a Wednesday at 10:00 pm, ET timeslot.

NBC and Netflix then announced, two months before the start of the 2006 fall season, that the pilot episodes of  Kidnapped and Studio 60 on the Sunset Strip (another new series) would be made available to Netflix subscribers on a specially issued preview DVD. The pilot for Kidnapped was also made available online at MSN.

Premiering on September 20, 2006, Kidnapped started airing on NBC on Wednesday nights. After the third episode performed poorly in the ratings, NBC announced that the show would be completed and aired within the 13 episodes of the original production order, instead of the usual 22 of a full TV season, and that the show would be rescheduled to Saturdays at 9 pm, ET, starting October 21.

After airing the fifth episode, NBC pulled the show from their schedule. NBC then announced that the remaining eight episodes would be shown online at the NBC website until completion of the story, with a new episode posted each Friday. The series finale was posted online on December 22, 2006, and the series was not renewed by NBC.  The entire series was released on DVD on April 24, 2007.

On June 24, 2007, NBC began to air the eight remaining unaired episodes of the series on overnight Sunday night/Monday mornings as part of the network's NBC All Night lineup, after Meet the Press, replacing the usual late night airing of Best of Dateline NBC at that time. This depended on local affiliates, however, as some stations only carry portions of the lineup, and some do not air NBC All Night at all.

The series also aired repeats on Universal HD.

Cast

Main

Recurring

Episodes

References

External links
 

2000s American crime drama television series
2006 American television series debuts
2007 American television series endings
Kidnapping in television
English-language television shows
NBC original programming
Serial drama television series
Television series by Sony Pictures Television
Television shows set in New York City